Short Stories is a studio album by the Kronos Quartet, containing works by Elliott Sharp, Willie Dixon, John Oswald, John Zorn, Henry Cowell, Steven Mackey, Scott Johnson, Sofia Gubaidulina, and Pandit Pran Nath.

Track listing

Critical reception 
AllMusic's "Blue" Gene Tyranny describes this album as a, "fascinating collection," of nine pieces by, "very different composers," and that, "the Kronos Quartet is in top form throughout all these selections." A Wired review says that, "a fine mesh of brains and guts, Short Stories is an eclectic roller-coaster ride through 20th-century music."

Personnel

Musicians 
David Harrington – violin
John Sherba – violin
Hank Dutt – viola
Joan Jeanrenaud – cello

Steven Mackey – electric guitar
Pandit Pran Nath – voice
Krishna Bhatt – tabla
Terry Riley – tanpura
John Constant – tanpura

Production 
Bob Edwards,  Howard Johnston – Engineers

See also 
List of 1993 albums

References 

1993 classical albums
Kronos Quartet albums
Nonesuch Records albums